The Education of H*Y*M*A*N K*A*P*L*A*N is a musical with lyrics and music by Oscar Brand and Paul Nassau. The musical book by Benjamin Bernard Zavin is based on Leo Rosten's stories of the fictional character Hyman Kaplan.

Productions
The musical premiered on Broadway on April 4, 1968, at the Alvin Theatre. The show ran for 29 regular performances and 12 previews, closing on April 27, 1968. It was directed by George Abbott and the cast included Tom Bosley as Hyman Kaplan, Susan Camber as Sarah Moskowitz, Dorothy Emmerson as Eileen Higby, Nathaniel Frey as Sam Pinsky, David Gold as Reben Plonsky, Donna McKechnie as Kathy McKenna, Barbara Minkus as Rose Mitnick, Dick Latessa as Giovanni Pastora, Hal Linden as Yissel Fishbein, Maggie Task as Fanny Gidwitz, Beryl Towbin as Marie Vitale, Rufus Smith as Judge Mahon, Mimi Sloan as Mrs. Mitnick, Honey Sanders as Mrs. Moskowitz, Gary Krawford as Mr. Parkhill, Wallace Engelhardt as Officer Callahan, and Stephen Bolster as Jimmy.

At intermission on opening night, the audience learned of the assassination of Martin Luther King Jr. According to Ken Mandelbaum, the audience "could only think about the fastest way to get home safely." Mandelbaum further notes that the creators felt that the circumstances during opening night "caused the show to fail."

The play was profiled in the William Goldman book The Season: A Candid Look at Broadway.

The musical was revived Off-Broadway at the American Jewish Theatre, opening in April 1989. The director was Lonny Price and Jack Hallett played Hyman.

Plot
The time is 1919 to 1920, and the place is the Lower East Side of New York City. At a night class in English, Hyman Kaplan is an immigrant from Kyiv, and tries to learn but has great difficulty. The teacher, Mr. Parkhill, finally concludes that Hyman cannot learn proper English.

Songs
Source: IBDB

Act 1
 "Strange New World" —	Mr. Parkhill
 "OOOO-EEEE" —	Hyman Kaplan, Rose Mitnick, Mr. Parkhill and Students
 "A Dedicated Teacher" — Eileen Higby, Marie Vitale and Mr. Parkhill
 "Lieben Dich" — Hyman Kaplan
 "Loving You" — Rose Mitnick
 "The Day I Met Your Father" — Mrs. Mitnick
 "Anything Is Possible" — Hyman Kaplan, Students, Dancers and Singers
 "Spring in the City" — Kathy McKenna, Giovanni Pastora, Reben Plonsky, Sam Pinsky, Mrs. Moskowitz, Fanny Gidwitz, Dancers and Singers

Act 2
 "Old Fashioned Husband" — Yissel Fishbein
 "Julius Caesar" — Hyman Kaplan
 "I Never Felt Better in My Life" — Hyman Kaplan, Dancers and Singers
 "When Will I Learn" — Rose Mitnick
 "All American" — Sam Pinsky and Students

References

External links 
 

1968 musicals
Broadway musicals